Alexios III may refer to:

 Alexios III Angelos (c. 1153–1211), Emperor of the Byzantine Empire
 Alexios III of Trebizond (1338–1390), Emperor of Trebizond